Xiong Chaozhong or Xiong Zhaozhong (born October 3, 1982) is a Chinese professional boxer. He is the first Chinese/Hmong to win a boxing world title, having held the WBC mini-flyweight title from 2012 to 2014.

Early life
Xiong was born in rural Wénshān to two Hmong farmers. He was the second child. Xiong grew up in poverty and after one year in high school, he dropped out to find work to support his family. Xiong ended up working in coal mines and in a banana plantation. Xiong used to scrap often in his youth and one of his cousins eventually convinced him to try boxing professionally, so Xiong moved to Kunming.

Professional career

Xiong debuted as a pro shortly after arriving in Kunming, with a points draw against Yu Ling Feng on August 15, 2006. Xiong won his next 11 fights, eight of them by stoppage, and claimed the WBC-ABCO Continental light-flyweight title. However, he would drop the title in his first defense, losing a unanimous decision to Filipino journeyman Julius Alcos. On May 26, 2009, Xiong challenged Daisuke Naito for the WBC flyweight title in Tokyo. Xiong had a considerable size disadvantage, but he was able to drop Naito in round 6. Per WBC rules, Xiong had two points deducted for accidental headbutts which opened cuts on Naito. Naito also had a point deduction after an accidental headbutt cut Xiong in round 10. Naito retained his title with a close unanimous decision (114-110, 114–111, 113–111) win. Over the next three years, Xiong suffered two more losses in Japan, dropping decisions to Takuya Kogawa and Shin Ono.

Xiong defeated Javier Martínez Resendiz for the vacant WBC mini-flyweight title. This made him the first Chinese boxer to ever win a world title. The fight took place in Kunming. Xiong cut Martínez in the third round and outboxed him for most of the fight, winning a unanimous decision (116-114, 116-112 and 119–110). Xiong's next fight took place in Dubai, where he faced Denver Cuello in a mandatory defense. Xiong was dropped in the first round. However, Cuello was unable to use his right hand because of a torn rotator cuff. Nevertheless, the fight remained close and Xiong won a narrow majority decision (113-113, 113–110, 115–112). After a further defense, Xiong faced Oswaldo Novoa in February 2014. Xiong was stopped by technical knockout in round 5, losing his world title on his third defense.

On October 25, 2014, Xiong attempted to regain a world title, facing WBA mini-flyweight champion Hekkie Budler in Monaco. Budler and Xiong traded knockdowns in rounds 2 and 3. The rest of the fight remained close, but Budler retained with a unanimous decision win (114-112, 114–112, 118–108). Xiong's final title challenge took place in 2018, when he faced WBA mini-flyweight champion Knockout CP Freshmart. Knockout outpointed Xiong to take a wide unanimous decision win (118-110, 118–110, 116–112). Xiong announced his retirement after the fight.

Professional boxing record

References

External links

Interview with Xiong Chao Zhong

Mini-flyweight boxers
1982 births
Living people
Sportspeople from Yunnan
People from Wenshan
Chinese male boxers
Hmong people